Blood Work may refer to:

 A medical process also known as a blood test
 Blood Work (novel) (1998), a novel by Michael Connelly
 Blood Work (film) (2002), a film based on the book, starring Clint Eastwood
 Bloodwork (film), 2012
 Bloodwork (EP), released by horror punk musician Wednesday 13 in 2008
 Bloodwork (album), released by metalcore band Texas in July in 2014
 "Bloodwork" (song), a single from the 2004 album A Snow Capped Romance by Alaskan metalcore band 36 Crazyfists
 Bloodwork Records, a record label owned by American punk rock drummer Dr. Chud
 Ramsey Rosso, a fictional character from DC Comics, also known as Bloodwork